My Old Lady  is a 2014 comedy-drama film written and directed by Israel Horovitz in his feature directorial debut. The film was released in 2014, and stars Maggie Smith, Kevin Kline, Kristin Scott Thomas, and Dominique Pinon. It was screened in the Special Presentations section of the 2014 Toronto International Film Festival.

Plot
Mathias/'Jim', a down-and-out New Yorker, travels to Paris planning to sell the large, valuable apartment in a coveted area he has inherited from his estranged father. Once there, he discovers an old woman, Mathilde, living in the apartment with her daughter Chloé.

Jim quickly learns that the apartment is a "viager" — an ancient French system for buying and selling property — meaning he will not actually be in possession of it until Mathilde dies. Until then he owes her a life annuity of €2,400 a month. All this is a surprise to him, as his father never told him and Jim had communication problems with the French lawyer, who doesn't speak English.

Jim has no money and no place to live, but Mathilde will allow him to stay in the apartment with her if he pays rent. However, to pay for the next life annuity payment, he takes and sells furniture from the apartment and also asks a prospective buyer of his contract for advance payments.

Inquiring after Mathilde's health her doctor/English student tells Jim she's in excellent health. Chatting over dinner, he learns she also barters English lessons with the fishmonger. Mathilde asks him if he visited there over the years, but he hadn't as his mother considered it to be enemy territory.

The next day, Jim invites Chloé and hotelier Francois Roy to a café as he wants to discuss possibly selling part of the house by dividing it into two apartments. Neither likes the idea, so Jim asks for a modest retainer while he considers Roy's offer (his way of getting a bit of cash).

Discovering Chloé is going to dinner with her male companion, Jim follows her after class. She goes to a café, waving down the man he's seen her entering a hotel with some days before. He waves her off, as he's going to dine with his wife and daughters. Observing this, Jim calls her out on it, trying to blackmail her to avoid paying the 2,400 euros.

Mathias/Jim discovers that Mathilde and his father had a very long-lasting affair started seven years before he was born, while both were married (they couldn't afford to marry each other). (And incidentally, his French name is the male equivalent of Mathilde.)

Jim makes Mathilde see how her affair with his father affected him and his mother. He felt unloved and ignored, so he turned to drink and had a string of failed marriages. She had a string of failed suicides, finally succeeding when he was 19, which he saw upon return from college.

After meeting with Roy to accept the sale, Jim returns to the apartment. Finding a photo of he and Chloé together at ten, Mathilde mentions it was the only time he's been there, and that his father stopped coming by after his mother died. Then Jim himself confesses to having slit his own wrists at 40, but although his father lived a few blocks away he didn't visit.

Upon reflection of how the adultery of their parents affected them emotionally, Chloé  breaks off her affair. Both she and Jim recall and bond over their childhoods. At 10 she realised about her mother's affair, at the same time he is trying to prevent the first of many suicide attempts by his.

The next day, Jim accepts the papers from Roy's lawyer, and Mathilde comes in, postulating that his mother must have known and approved of her affair with his father. When he divulges that she had 10 to 15 suicide attempts, the last being successful, she collapses from shock.

Jim and Chloé have a moment and kiss, but then when she asks Mathilde if she shares a father with Jim, she says she is unsure. He overhears, so goes to run blood tests at the doctor's.

Once Mathias/Jim gets the confirmation that he and Chloé are NOT related, as she wants to stay in the apartment, he decides at the last minute to decline Roy's multi-million Euro offer for the apartment/contract. Mathilde points out that they do not have to worry about money if they sell en viager, albeit they'd receive a modest income due to their relatively young ages.

Cast
 Kevin Kline as Mathias "Jim" Gold
 Kristin Scott Thomas as Chloé Girard
 Maggie Smith as Mathilde Girard
 Stéphane Freiss as François Roy
 Dominique Pinon as Monsieur Lefebvre
 Stéphane De Groodt as Philippe
 Christian Rauth - Furniture Dealer
 Delphine Lanson - Femme de Ménage
 Noémie Lvovsky as Dr. Florence Horowitz (Mathilde's doctor)
 Sophie Touitou as Female Opera Singer 
 Nathalie Newman as Philippe's Wife 
 Ora Yermia as Girl with Roses
 Gillian Horovitz as Gardienne
 Balkissa Touréh as Messenger

Development
The film My Old Lady is an adaptation of Horovitz's play of the same name, which premiered in 1996 at the Gloucester Stage Co., founded by Horovitz in East Gloucester, MA.

Horovitz, principally a playwright and theatre director, and whose plays have been translated and performed in more than 30 languages worldwide, had previously directed only one film, 3 Weeks After Paradise, a 51-minute testimonial from 2002 about his family's experiences following the September 11, 2001, terrorist attacks on New York's World Trade Center.

Production
My Old Lady is a British–French–American film production venture between BBC Films, Cohen Media Group, and Deux Chevaux Films. The film is produced by Rachael Horovitz (Moneyball), Gary Foster (Sleepless in Seattle), Nitsa Benchetrit and David Barrot. Film production began filming on location in Paris and its surrounding suburbs on September 26, 2013.

Reception
On Rotten Tomatoes the film has an approval rating of 61% based on 89 reviews. The site's consensus reads, "Although My Old Lady doesn't quite live up to its stars' talents, Kevin Kline and Maggie Smith carry the film capably whenever they're together onscreen." On Metacritic, the film has a score of 53 out 100 based on reviews from 19 critics, indicating "mixed or average reviews".

John DeFore  of The Hollywood Reporter wrote: "Kline remains a pleasure to watch, surviving the character's deepening self-pity and making his suspiciously unwriterly carelessness with words (he refers to the trophy head of a wild boar as a "cow") almost charming."
Variety's Andrew Barker gave a mixed review: "Its translation from stage to screen looks to have been a bit rocky, and the film never manages to transcend its actors-workshop aura and develop into something deeper."

References

External links
 
 
 
 
 
 UniFrance
 AlloCiné

2014 comedy-drama films
2014 films
American comedy-drama films
BBC Film films
British comedy-drama films
Films scored by Mark Orton
Films set in Paris
Films shot in Paris
Films about playwrights
French comedy-drama films
2010s French-language films
American independent films
British independent films
French independent films
English-language French films
2014 independent films
2010s English-language films
2014 multilingual films
American multilingual films
British multilingual films
French multilingual films
2010s American films
2010s British films
2010s French films